And Lead Us Not Into Temptation (German: ...und führe uns nicht in Versuchung) is a 1957 West German drama film directed by Rolf Hansen and starring Johanna Matz, Heidemarie Hatheyer and Gerhard Riedmann.

It was shot at the Spandau Studios in Berlin and on location around Bolzano in Trentino. The film's sets were designed by the art directors Kurt Herlth and Robert Herlth.

Synopsis
After causing a tragic crash while flirting with a woman, a small town railwayman is haunted by guilt.

Cast
 Johanna Matz as Anna 
 Heidemarie Hatheyer as Frau Hudetz 
 Gerhard Riedmann as Hudetz 
 Rudolf Forster as von Hausen 
 Annie Rosar as Frau Leimgruber 
 Willy Rösner as Aigner 
 Bruno Dallansky as Ferdinand 
 Karl Ehmann as Pfarrer 
 Erica Beer as Sekretärin 
 Wolfgang Hebenstreit as Prosecutor
 Nora Minor as Freundin 
 Hugo Gottschlich as Kondukteur 
 Minna Spaeth as Zenzi 
 Hans Fitz as Landarzt 
 Martin Berliner as Kommissar

References

Bibliography
 Bock, Hans-Michael & Bergfelder, Tim. The Concise CineGraph. Encyclopedia of German Cinema. Berghahn Books, 2009.

External links 
 

1957 films
1957 drama films
German drama films
West German films
1950s German-language films
Films directed by Rolf Hansen
Constantin Film films
Films shot at Spandau Studios
Films shot in Italy
German films based on plays
1950s German films